Camblain-Châtelain is a commune in the Pas-de-Calais department in the Hauts-de-France region of France.

Geography

Population

Places of interest
 The church of St.Vaast, dating from the fifteenth century.
 Ruins of an 11th-century castle.

See also
Communes of the Pas-de-Calais department

References

Camblainchatelain